The West Indies women's cricket team toured England in June and July 1979. They played England in three Test matches and three One Day Internationals, with the Test series ending as a 2–0 victory for England and the ODI series finishing as a 1–1 draw, with one match abandoned.

Squads

Tour Matches

1-day single innings matches

WODI Series

1st ODI

2nd ODI

3rd ODI

Test Series

1st Test

2nd Test

3rd Test

References

External links
West Indies Women tour of England 1979 from Cricinfo

Women's cricket tours of England
1979 in English cricket
West Indies women's cricket team tours